Acraea asboloplintha, the black-winged acraea, is a butterfly in the family Nymphalidae. It is found in the Democratic Republic of the Congo, Rwanda, Burundi, Uganda, Kenya and Tanzania.

Description

A. asboloplintha Karsch (54 a). A very distinct species. Forewing above unicolorous dark smoky black with indistinct discal dots and occasionally at the hindmargin in the middle of 1 a with red-yellow scaling, beneath light yellowish brown with distinct discal dots, black fringes and very fine marginal line. Hindwing above light orange-yellow, at the base black as far as vein 2 and with free black discal dots and black fringes, beneath at the base and inner margin red, then light yellowish and beyond the discal dots with light orange-yellow transverse band 4 mm. 
in breadth, which does not reach the distal margin, so that a light yellowish transverse band is formed. In the female the hindwing above is often yellow-brown instead of orange-yellow. Ruwenzori, Uganda and British East Africa - rubescens Eltr. differs in having the hindwing above rose-coloured, while the forewing has a hindmarginal spot of the same colour, which covers the base of cellule 2 and also a part of the cell. In the female the 
corresponding parts are white. British East Africa.

Subspecies
Acraea asboloplintha asboloplintha (Rwanda, Burundi, Uganda, western Kenya, north-western Tanzania, Democratic Republic of the Congo: east to Ituri and Kivu)
Acraea asboloplintha rubescens Trimen, 1909 (Kenya: highlands east of the Rift Valley)

Biology
The habitat consists of forests and heavy woodland.

The larvae feed on Basananthe zanzibarica and Adenia lobata.

Taxonomy
It is a member of the Acraea caecilia  species group. See also Pierre & Bernaud, 2014.

References

External links

Images representing Acraea asboloplintha at Bold
Acraea asboloplinta asboloplintha at Pteron

Butterflies described in 1894
asboloplintha
Butterflies of Africa